One More Time may refer to:

Film and television 
 One More Time (1931 film), a Merrie Melodies cartoon
 One More Time (1970 film), a film by Jerry Lewis
 One More Time, a 1974 TV special with Carol Channing, Pearl Bailey, and others
 One More Time (2015 film), a film by Robert Edwards
 One More Time (Canadian TV series), a 1969–1970 Canadian music program
 One More Time (South Korean TV series), a 2016 South Korean web series

Episodes 
 "One More Time" (The A-Team)
 "One More Time" (The Cosby Show)
 "One More Time" (Second Thoughts)
 "One More Time" (The Vice)
 "One More Time", an episode of The Education of Max Bickford

Music
 One Mo' Time (musical), a 1979 Broadway musical revue by Vernel Bagneris
 One More Time (band), a Swedish pop group

Albums 
 One More Time (One More Time album), 1994
 One More Time (Real McCoy album), 
 One More Time – Live in Utrecht 1992, a 1999 album by Procol Harum
 One More Time: The MCA Recordings, a 2000 album by Kelly Willis
 Basie One More Time, a 1959 album by the Count Basie Orchestra
 One More Time, a 1962 album by Eddy Arnold
 One More Time, a 2000 album by UMO Jazz Orchestra, Kenny Wheeler, and Norma Winstone
 One More Time, a 1999 album by Ronald Cheng
 One Mo' Time, a 2004 album by The Black Sorrows
 One More Time (EP), a 2018 extended play release by Super Junior

Songs 
 "One More Time" (1931 song)
 "One More Time" (Craig David song), 2016
 "One More Time" (Daft Punk song), 2000
 "One More Time" (Diesel song)
 "One More Time" (HammerFall song), 2011
 "One More Time" (Benjamin Ingrosso song), 2017
 "One More Time" (James LaBrie song)
 "One More Time" (Joe Jackson song), 1979
 "One More Time" (Alison Moyet song), 2007
 "One More Time" (Laura Pausini song)
 "One More Time" (Porno Graffitti song), 2011
 "One More Time" (Real McCoy song)
 "One More Time" (Twice song), 2017
 "One More Time (The Sunshine Song)", 2000 
 "One More Time", by Ariel Pink's Haunted Graffiti from Scared Famous/FF»
 "One More Time", by Badfinger from Airwaves
 “One More Time”, by Carly Simon from Carly Simon
 "One More Time", by The Carpenters from A Kind of Hush
 "One More Time", by The Clash from Sandinista!
 "One More Time", by The Cure from Kiss Me, Kiss Me, Kiss Me
 "One More Time", by Estelle from Lovers Rock
 "One More Time", by Kenny G from Paradise
 "One More Time", by Korn from Untouchables
 "One More Time", by The Lemonheads from Car Button Cloth
 "One More Time", by Lynyrd Skynyrd from Street Survivors
 "One More Time", by Max Coveri
 "One More Time", by Michael Bolton from the soundtrack of the film Sing
 "One More Time", by Nancy Sinatra from Woman
 "One More Time", by Rod Stewart from album The Tears of Hercules, 2021
 "One More Time", by Sam Cooke from the B-side of the single "Twistin' the Night Away"
 "One More Time", by Them from The Angry Young Them Other media 
 One More Time (book), a 1986 memoir by Carol Burnett

 See also 
 ...Baby One More Time (disambiguation)
 One More Time, OK? (Korean: Hanbeon deo, OK?''), a 2007 album by The Grace
 One Time (disambiguation)
 Repeat (disambiguation)